Shoal Lake may refer to:

Lakes

 Shoal Lake (Kenora District, Ontario), Canada
 Shoal Lakes (Manitoba), Canada

Municipalities

 Municipality of Shoal Lake, Manitoba, Canada
 Shoal Lake, Manitoba

First Nations

 Shoal Lake First Nation, Saskatchewan, Canada
 Shoal Lake 40 First Nation, Manitoba/Ontario, Canada

First Nations reserves

 Shoal Lake 31J
 Shoal Lake 34B1
 Shoal Lake 34B2
 Shoal Lake 37A
 Shoal Lake 39
 Shoal Lake 39A
 Shoal Lake 40

See also
 Bull Shoals Lake